The Government of the Republic of the Rif was established on 18 September 1921 when the Riffian Tribes, led by Abd el-Krim, beat Spain in the Battle of Annual during the Rif War and created the Confederal Republic of the Tribes of the Rif. 

The Republic of the Rif is considered the first-ever independent non-monarchical modern Amazigh state.

After the Riffian victory, President Abd el-Krim and his Council of Ministers issued a document titled "Government of the Rif Republic; Declaration of State and Proclamation to all Nations" declaring the independence of the Rif from the Franco-Spanish colonial dominion and from the Arab-Alouite Sultan Yusef of Morocco.

The federal government of the Republic of the Rif

Executive branch 
 President : Moulay Mohand Abd el-Krim el-Khattabi
 Prime Minister: Hajj Hatmi
 President of the Council of Ministers: AbdelSelam Mohammed el-Khattabi
 Minister of Justice: Mohammed Echems
 Minister of Interior: Shaikh Yazid n-Hajj Hammu
 Minister of War: Mohammed ben Omar
 Minister of Foreign Affairs: Moulay Mohand Abd el-Krim el-Khattabi

Symbolic Offices 
 Princess (Lalla) of the Rif: Lalla Mimouna Boujibar
 Imam Prince of the Believers (ʾamīr al-muʾminīn): Moulay Mohand Abd el-Krim el-Khattabi

Legislative branch
 Congress of Representatives of the Tribes of the Rif

Riffian people
Governments in Africa by country
Rif War